D. antarctica may refer to:
 Deschampsia antarctica, the Antarctic hair grass, a flowering plant species native to Antarctica
 Dicksonia antarctica, the soft tree fern, man fern or Tasmanian tree fern, an evergreen tree fern species native to parts of Australia
 Durvillaea antarctica, a kelp species found in southern New Zealand and Chile

See also
 Antarctica (disambiguation)